Bread and Tulips is a 2000 romance comedy film directed by Italian Director Silvio Soldini. The movie stars Licia Maglietta and Bruno Ganz as Rosalba Barletta and Fernando Girasole. The film was an official selection at numerous film festivals, including the Cannes Film Festival and the Toronto International Film Festival.

Plot
Rosalba Barletta, a Neapolitan-born housewife from Pescara, finds herself stranded during a family vacation. Instead of waiting for her controlling and unfaithful husband, she hitchhikes her way home, only to impulsively detour to Venice. In the lagoon city, the woman, who soon runs out of money, finds accommodations with a restaurant maître d'hôtel, Fernando Girasole, an elderly man from Iceland who speaks a refined and literary Italian. Rosalba finds herself enjoying her new life: she strikes up an affectionate friendship with the holistic masseuse Grazia, Fernando's neighbour, and finds a job at a small flower shop run by Fermo, an elderly and ill-tempered anarchist who is won over by the woman's polite ways.

Meanwhile, her husband sent Costantino, a bumbling plumber who has come for the interview to his company, as a private detective to find her. Rosalba is increasingly attracted by the delicate, romantic and mysterious personality of the discreet waiter, and a relationship of small daily gestures develops between them. On the other hand, during his search Costantino meets Grazia and instantly falls in love with her. He calls Rosalba's husband and quits his detective job, claiming that he no longer intends to look for his wife.

However, Rosalba is eventually joined by her husband's lover, a family friend, who induces her to return home, making her believe that her son has taken to drugs during her absence. She abandons her Venice life to return to her parental duties and daily routine, finding that nothing has changed at all and her son is not really in danger.

Left in Venice all by himself, Fernando borrows Fermo's van to undertake a journey to Pescara, where he finally declares his love to Rosalba. The woman thus returns to Venice for good with her youngest son.

Cast
 Licia Maglietta as Rosalba Barletta
 Bruno Ganz as Fernando Girasole
 Giuseppe Battiston as Costantino Caponangeli
 Antonio Catania as Mimmo Barletta, Rosalba's husband
 Marina Massironi as Grazia Reginella
 Felice Andreasi as Fermo
 Vitalba Andrea as Ketty, Mimmo's lover
 Ludovico Paladin as Eliseo Girasole, Fernando's nephew
 Tatiana Lepore as Adele, Eliseo's mother
 Silvana Bosi as Costantino's mother
 Tiziano Cucchiarelli as Nicola Barletta ("Nic")
 Don Backy as the singer in the dance hall
 Daniela Piperno as the woman giving a lift to Rosalba
 Fausto Russo Alesi as the man giving a lift to Rosalba

Music 
 "Moro" by Lars Hollmer
 "Franska Valsen" by Lars Hollmer
 Theme from "La Gazza Ladra" by Gioachino Rossini
 "Il Valzer di Vera Zasulich" by Giovanni Venosta
 "Disco Man" by Ranee Lee, Alain Leroux, Jacques Lafleche, sung by Ranee Lee
 "Eclisse Twist" by Michelangelo Antonioni, performed by Tuscolano Brothers
 "Frasi d'amori" by Aldo Caponi and Detto Mariano, sung by Don Backy
 "Tu Solamente Tu" (1939) by Pasquale Frustaci and Michele Galdieri, sung by Tiola Silenzi
 "Rosa y Clavel" by B. Valli and Giovanni Venosta, sung by Lorenzo Castelluccio accompanied by Rhapsodija Trio

Box office 
The film was released on July 27, 2001 and grossed $32,933 in the opening weekend. It went on to gross $5,318,679 in the American market and $3,159,755 from the overseas market for a worldwide total of $8,478,434.

Awards
 5 Nastro d'Argento: Best Actress, Best Director, Best Screenplay, Best Supporting Actor and Best Supporting Actress.
 9 David di Donatello: Best Film, Best Director, Best Actress, Best Actor, Best Cinematography, Best Screenplay, Best sound, Best supporting actor (Giuseppe Battiston) and Best supporting actress (Marina Massironi ).

References

External links 
 
 

2000 films
2000s Italian-language films
2000 romantic comedy films
Films set in Venice
Films set in Pescara
Films shot in Pescara
Films directed by Silvio Soldini
Italian romantic comedy films